Nyika National Park lies in the northeast of Zambia, on the western edge of the Nyika Plateau, which is one of the highest parts of the country and most of which lies in neighbouring Malawi.

As a consequence of the colonial era when both countries were administered by Britain, a cross-border reserve was established on the plateau. After independence it was divided into the large Nyika National Park (Malawi) and the much smaller Nyika National Park (Zambia). The border between the two parks is the north-south plateau road, which is the only road access, and it starts and finishes in Malawi. Consequently Zambian visitors must enter Malawi to reach it (the nearest Malawian entry points are at Chisenga and Katumbi via the M14).

The Zambian side is undeveloped except for a colonial-era resthouse, built around 1946, which used to be the only accommodation in either park. After independence, people from Malawi staying there did not have to pass through any border formalities, but paid a "Zambia entrance fee" along with their accommodation bill. It closed in 1998, but was refurbished by a private tour company and reopened in 2006 as the "Nyika House", available only to pre-booked tour groups. As they have already entered Malawi and there are no formalities and restrictions at the boundary between the two parks, visitors from Zambia usually also visit the facilities and features of the Malawian park.

Between September and April, a wide variety of wildflowers can be seen in the national park. The Nyika Plateau and two smaller highland areas to the north are the only representatives in Zambia of the Southern Rift montane forest-grassland mosaic ecoregion. For other details of the park environment and wildlife, see the Malawian park.

See also

Wildlife of Zambia

References

Central Zambezian miombo woodlands
Geography of Muchinga Province
National parks of Zambia
Southern Rift montane forest–grassland mosaic